The Montenegrin–Ottoman War (1861–1862) was a war between the Principality of Montenegro and the Ottoman Empire that took place between 1861 and 1862. The war ended and Montenegro had to acknowledge Ottoman suzerainty.

In 1861 Montenegro encouraged a revolt in Herzegovina by their ethnic kinsmen.
Ottoman forces under Omar Pasha were first defeated but eventually prevailed. The Montenegrins were pressed by the Great Powers and withheld their forces from fighting in Herzegovina. The Ottoman army then invaded Montenegro.
After the unsuccessful defense of Ostrog Monastery by Mirko Petrović, the Montenegrins were defeated.

The war ended  with the Convention of Scutari of August 31, 1862. Montenegro was forced to acknowledge Ottoman suzerainty, however the terms were generous because the Ottomans wanted to win Montenegrin goodwill.
The borders of 1859 were restored, the Montenegrins were allowed to import any goods, except arms, through Ottoman territory and to rent agricultural lands.

Battles fought
Battle of Ostrog

References

Further reading
Knežević, Saša (2000). "The Times’ coverage of the Montenegrin-Turkish War in 1862". South Slav Journal, 21(3–4) (81–82): pp. 60–69.

Conflicts in 1861
Conflicts in 1862
Wars involving the Ottoman Empire
Wars involving Montenegro
19th-century military history of Montenegro
1860s in the Ottoman Empire
1861 in Europe
1862 in Europe
Principality of Montenegro
Ottoman period in the history of Montenegro